The 1996–97 Campionato Sammarinese di Calcio season was the 12th season since its establishment. It was contested by 16 teams, and S.S. Folgore/Falciano won the championship.

Regular season

Group A

Group B

Results
All teams play twice against the teams within their own group and once against the teams from the other group.

Championship playoffs

First round
S.P. La Fiorita 0-0 (pen 5-4) A.C. Libertas
S.C. Faetano 4-3 S.P. Cailungo

Second round
S.S. Virtus 2-3 S.P. La Fiorita
S.C. Faetano 2-2 (pen 6-5) S.S. Folgore/Falciano

Third round
S.S. Folgore/Falciano 3-1 A.C. Libertas
S.P. Cailungo 3-2 S.S. Virtus

Fourth round
S.P. La Fiorita 2-2 (pen 7-6) S.C. Faetano

Fifth Round
S.S. Folgore/Falciano 2-1 S.P. Cailungo

Sixth Round
S.S. Folgore/Falciano 2-0 S.C. Faetano

Final
S.S. Folgore/Falciano 2-1 S.P. La Fiorita

References
San Marino - List of final tables (RSSSF)

Campionato Sammarinese di Calcio
San Marino
1996–97 in San Marino football